Yosimar Arias Céspedes (born 24 September 1986) is a Costa Rican professional footballer who plays for Municipal Grecia.

Club career
Arias started his career at Alajuelense and played for Puntarenas and Brujas before moving abroad for a spell in Mexico with Dorados de Sinaloa but was released in May 2011. He returned to Costa Rica when signed by Herediano but then had another stint abroad with Guatemalan side Municipal whom he left in December 2012.

International career
In 2003, Arias played at the FIFA U-17 World Championship. 
He made his senior debut for Costa Rica in a January 2009 UNCAF Nations Cup match against Panama and has earned a total of 5 caps, scoring no goal. He has represented his country at the 2009 UNCAF Nations Cup and the 2009 CONCACAF Gold Cup.

His final international was an October 2010 friendly match against El Salvador.

References

External links
 
 

1986 births
Living people
Footballers from San José, Costa Rica
Association football midfielders
Costa Rican footballers
Costa Rica international footballers
2009 UNCAF Nations Cup players
2009 CONCACAF Gold Cup players
L.D. Alajuelense footballers
Puntarenas F.C. players
Brujas FC players
Dorados de Sinaloa footballers
C.S. Herediano footballers
C.S.D. Municipal players
Municipal Grecia players
Liga FPD players
Costa Rican expatriate footballers
Expatriate footballers in Mexico
Expatriate footballers in Guatemala
Costa Rican expatriate sportspeople in Mexico
Costa Rican expatriate sportspeople in Guatemala